Dingfelder's Delicatessen is a restaurant in Seattle's Capitol Hill neighborhood, in the U.S. state of Washington.

Description 
The Jewish deli Dingfelder's operates in a brick building in Seattle's Capitol Hill neighborhood. The menu has included bagels and corned beef and pastrami sandwiches. For Hanukkah, the business has served latkes. For Passover, the delicatessen has served brisket, brisket gravy, whole roasted kosher lemon chicken, chicken soup, potato kugels, and smoked salmon, with mushroom barley, split pea, and cabbage soup as vegan options. The deli has also had a special menu for Rosh Hashanah.

History 
Dingfelder's began operating in 2018. The business is owned by Vance Dingfelder and Stephanie Hemsworth.

See also
 List of Jewish delis

References

External links 

 
 

2018 establishments in Washington (state)
Capitol Hill, Seattle
Jewish delicatessens in the United States
Jews and Judaism in Seattle
Restaurants established in 2018
Restaurants in Seattle
Delicatessens in Washington (state)